Peter Piper Pizza  (stylized as peter piper pizza) is an Arizona-based pizza and entertainment company with locations in Arizona, California, New Mexico, Texas and Mexico. Restaurants have a large dining area and a game room.

History
Anthony "Tony" Cavolo founded Peter Piper Pizza in Arizona in 1973. The first Peter Piper opened in Glendale, Arizona. There are 149 restaurants in the United States and Mexico. In 1995, Peter Piper acquired its hometown competitor Pistol Pete's Pizza. They were independent until 1992, when Peter Piper Inc. was acquired by The Venture West Group. The company was sold again to ACON Investments in 2007. Apollo Global Management, owners of CEC Entertainment, Inc., the parent company of the Chuck E. Cheese restaurant chain, acquired the company in October 2014. CEC Entertainment, Inc., Peter Piper Pizza's parent company, filed for bankruptcy in 2020 due to the significant financial strain brought on by the COVID-19 pandemic. But, CEC Entertainment, the owners of Chuck E. Cheese and Peter Piper Pizza chains, emerged from its June bankruptcy under the ownership selling of its lenders led by Monarch Alternative Capital.

In March 2014, Peter Piper Pizza redesigned its logo utilizing a serif font face following an abstract design. The new logo was created by WD Partners as part of an effort "to connect with Gen X and Millennial parents." The updated design was widely panned.

References

Further reading
 Peter Piper Pizza 2016 Expansion

External links
 

Companies based in Scottsdale, Arizona
Economy of the Southwestern United States
Regional restaurant chains in the United States
Pizza chains of the United States
Pizza franchises
Theme restaurants
Video arcades
Buffet restaurants
Restaurants established in 1973
Entertainment companies established in 1973
1973 establishments in Arizona
2014 mergers and acquisitions
Companies that filed for Chapter 11 bankruptcy in 2020
American companies established in 1973